Carlos Berlanga (born 9 June 1972) is a retired Spanish sprinter, who specialized in the 100 metres.

Berlanga finished seventh in  relay at the 1997 World Championships, together with teammates Frutos Feo, Venancio José and Jordi Mayoral. He also finished eighth in  relay at the 2002 World Cup.

His personal best time is 10.29 seconds, achieved in July 1996 in Monachil.

References

1972 births
Living people
Spanish male sprinters
Mediterranean Games bronze medalists for Spain
Mediterranean Games medalists in athletics
Athletes (track and field) at the 2001 Mediterranean Games